The desert yellow bat (Scotoecus pallidus) is a species of vesper bat. It is found in India, Pakistan, and Bangladesh. Its natural habitats are subtropical or tropical dry forests and shrubland, rural gardens, and urban areas.

References

Scotoecus
Taxa named by George Edward Dobson
Mammals described in 1876
Mammals of Pakistan
Mammals of India
Mammals of Bangladesh
Taxonomy articles created by Polbot
Bats of Asia